Jonathan Bumbu (born 11 February 1999) is a French professional footballer who plays as a midfielder for Italian  club Cesena.

Club career
On 2 July 2019, Bumbu signed a professional contract with Amiens. He made his professional debut with Amiens in a Coupe de France match against Rennes on 4 January 2020.

On 1 February 2021, Bumbu joined Boulogne on loan until the end of the 2020–21 season.

In October 2021, Bumbu signed for Slovenian PrvaLiga side Radomlje.

On 23 July 2022, Bumbu moved to Cesena in Italy on a two-year contract.

Personal life
Born in France, Bumbu is of DR Congolese descent.

References

External links
 
 

1999 births
Living people
People from Mantes-la-Jolie
French sportspeople of Democratic Republic of the Congo descent
Black French sportspeople
French footballers
Association football midfielders
Lille OSC players
Amiens SC players
US Boulogne players
NK Radomlje players
Cesena F.C. players
Championnat National 2 players
Championnat National 3 players
Championnat National players
Slovenian PrvaLiga players
French expatriate footballers
French expatriate sportspeople in Slovenia
Expatriate footballers in Slovenia
French expatriate sportspeople in Italy
Expatriate footballers in Italy